Wacquemoulin is a commune in the Oise department in northern France, located 20 km north west of Compiegne. Wacquemoulin station has rail connections to Amiens and Compiègne.

Population

See also
Communes of the Oise department

References

Communes of Oise